Puja Abdillah (born 27 November 1996) is an Indonesian professional footballer who plays as a winger  for Liga 2 club Persikab Bandung.

Club career

Persib Bandung
He made his professional debut in the Liga 1 on 15 July 2017, against Mitra Kukar where he played as a substitute.

Bandung United (loan)
He was signed for Bandung United to play in the Liga 2 in the 2019 season, on loan from Persib Bandung. He made 11 league appearances and scored 1 goal for Bandung United.

Persikab Bandung
On 18 June 2022, it was announced that Puja would be joining Persikab Bandung for the 2022-23 Liga 2 campaign. He made his league debut on 18 August 2022 in a match against PSIM Yogyakarta at the Si Jalak Harupat Stadium, Soreang.

References

External links
 
 Puja Abdillah at Liga Indonesia

Indonesian footballers
Living people
1996 births
Persib Bandung players
Liga 1 (Indonesia) players
Sportspeople from Bandung
Association football wingers
21st-century Indonesian people